Igor Borisovich Kachmazov (30 August 1968 – 10 August 2019) was a Russian professional footballer. He made his professional debut in the Soviet First League in 1986 for FC Spartak Ordzhonikidze. He played 1 game in the UEFA Cup 1993–94 for FC Spartak Vladikavkaz.

Honours
 Russian Premier League runner-up: 1992.

References

1968 births
Sportspeople from Vladikavkaz
2019 deaths
Soviet footballers
Russian footballers
Association football midfielders
FC Spartak Vladikavkaz players
Russian Premier League players
FC Tyumen players
FC Lokomotiv Saint Petersburg players